PACE Sports Management is a sports management and marketing company based in Monaco and London, directed by Ricky Simms.

Background

KIM McDonald International management was founded in the 80's by former middle distance runner Kim McDonald.  The company managed the careers of many of the legends in the sport of Athletics including Noah Ngeny, Daniel Komen, Moses Kiptanui, Steve Ovett, Sonia O'Sullivan, Peter Elliott, Liz McColgan and Bob Kennedy.  After McDonald's death in 2001 Ricky Simms took over as CEO with partners Marion Steininger and Duncan Gaskell (who had been a partner in KIM). The company rebranded to PACE Sports Management in 2004.  In October 2010 Simms, who coaches Olympic Champion Vivian Cheruiyot among others, was honored for his "service to athletics" alongside 56 other UK Athletics coaches in European Athletics’ Coaches Roll of Honor.

Activities
PACE Sports Management is a sports management and marketing company working with some of the biggest names in the world of sport. Services include competition planning and management, contract negotiations and servicing, marketing and promotion, merchandising and brand building, social media optimization, coaching, financial, legal, medical, travel, visa and accommodation management. PACE Sports Management has negotiated some of the biggest deals in the history of the sport, both on and off track.

Notable clients
PACE Sports Management manages athletes from all over the world including Olympic & World Champions: Usain Bolt, Sir Mo Farah, Vivian Cheruiyot, Dina Asher-Smith, Christine Ohuruogu, Matthew Centrowitz, Hellen Obiri & Trayvon Bromell. Other notable clients include Galen Rupp, Jordan Hasay, Fred Kerley, Shamier Little, Shannon Rowbury, Matthew Hudson-Smith, Ristananna Tracey, Jenna Prandini & Kemar Bailey-Cole.

References

Companies based in the London Borough of Richmond upon Thames
British sports agents